The East Coast Wrestling Association (ECWA) is a professional wrestling promotion based in Newark, Delaware. Former employees in ECWA consist of professional wrestlers, managers, play-by-play and color commentators, announcers, interviewers and referees.

List of ECWA alumni

Male wrestlers

Female wrestlers

Special guests

Super 8 Tournament

Stables and tag teams

Managers and valets

Commentators and interviewers

See also
List of professional wrestlers

References
ECWA roster
East Coast Wrestling Association at OWW.com

External links
Official website
ECWA: The Stomping Ground for Future Superstars at the Bleacher Report

Alumni
East Coast Wrestling Association alumni